Mollahasan can refer to:

 Mollahasan, Çorum
 Mollahasan, Göle